John C. Oxtoby (1910–1991) was an American mathematician. In 1936, he graduated with a Master of Science in Mathematics from Harvard University. He was professor of mathematics at Bryn Mawr College in Pennsylvania from 1939 until his retirement in 1979.

Works

References

External links
 

20th-century American mathematicians
1910 births
1991 deaths
Bryn Mawr College faculty
Measure theorists
Category theorists
Topologists
Harvard University alumni